Catocala nagioides is a moth of the family Erebidae. It is found in Japan and eastern Russia.

The wingspan is about 25 mm (0.98 inches).

References

External links
Image
Species info

nagioides
Moths of Japan
Moths of Asia
Moths described in 1924